A2B may refer to:
 
A2B Australia, a taxi operator
A2B Bicycles, an electric bicycle company
Adyar Ananda Bhavan, a chain of restaurants and confectioners in India